Stella Maris (Latin, 'star of the sea') may refer to:

 Our Lady, Star of the Sea, an old title for the Virgin Mary 
 Polaris, a star commonly called the North Star or Pole Star, associated with the Virgin Mary

Arts and entertainment

Films 
 Stella Maris (1918 film), with Mary Pickford 
 Stella Maris (1925 film), remake with Mary Philbin

Music 
 Stella Maris, a 1987 album by The Albion Band
 "Stella Maris", a song by Einstürzende Neubauten from the 1996 album Ende Neu
 "Stella Maris", a song by Moby from the 2011 album Destroyed
 "Stella Maris", a 2013 composition by Samuel Hazo
 "Stella Maris", a song by Gigi Masin from the 2014 album Talk to the Sea

Literature 
 Stella Maris (novel), a 2022 novel by Cormac McCarthy

Places 
 Stella Maris, Darwin, Australia, a historical site 
 Stella Maris, Bahamas
 Stella Maris Airport
 Stella Maris Light, lighthouse in Haifa, Israel
 Stella Maris Homes, a housing development in Packer Park, Philadelphia

Schools, religious institutions and hospitals
 Stella Maris Catholic Primary School, in Park Grove, Tasmania, Australia
 Stella Maris College (disambiguation)
 Stella Maris High School, Queens, New York,U.S.
 Stella Maris English School, Pune, Maharashtra, India
 Stella Maris Hospice, a large nursing home complex in Timonium, Maryland
 Stella Maris Monastery, Haifa, Israel
 Stella Maris Polytechnic University, Monrovia, Liberia
 Stella Maris Primary School, Silverdale, Auckland, New Zealand
 Stella Maris School, Stockport, England
 Stella Maris, or Apostleship of the Sea, a welfare organisation for seafarers
 Stella-Maris-De-Kent Hospital, Sainte-Anne-de-Kent, New Brunswick, Canada

Ships
 , a German and Dutch cargo ship in service 1957-58
  (1965-1998), a cruise ship with Sun Lines
 , steam tug in Halifax Explosion of 1917
 Stella Maris 28-C, formerly Empire Sandboy, a dredger
 Stella Maris, formerly , a Panamanian ship 1960–1965

Other uses
 ITC Stella Maris, tennis complex in Umag, Croatia
 Stella Maris F.C., an Irish youth football club
 Stella Maris, a type of virtual periscope
 Stella Maris Bait Shop, Brooklyn, NY

See also
 
 Star of the Sea (disambiguation)
 Our Lady Star of the Sea Church (disambiguation) 
 Mary, mother of Jesus
 "Ave maris stella", a medieval Marian hymn